{{Infobox person
| name               = Michael Dirda
| image              = Michael Dirda.jpg
| caption            = Dirda in 2009
| occupation         = Book critic for the Washington Post
| birth_date         = 1948 (age 73–74)
}}
Michael Dirda (born 1948) is a book critic for the Washington Post. He has been a Fulbright Fellow and won a Pulitzer Prize in 1993.

Career
Having studied at Oberlin College for his undergraduate degree in 1970, Dirda took an M.A. in 1974 and PhD in 1977 from Cornell University in comparative literature. In 1978 Dirda started writing for the Washington Post; in 1993 he won the Pulitzer Prize for his criticism.  Currently, he is a book columnist for the Post.

In 2002, Dirda was invested as a member of The Baker Street Irregulars.

Works
Two collections of Dirda's literary journalism have been published:

 Readings: Essays and Literary Entertainments (Bloomington: Indiana University Press, 2000) 
 Bound to Please (New York: W. W. Norton, 2005) 

He has also written:

 An Open Book: Coming of Age in the Heartland (New York: W. W. Norton, 2003)  (autobiography)
 Book by Book: Notes on Reading and Life (New York: Henry Holt, 2005) 
 Classics for Pleasure (Orlando: Harcourt, 2007) 
 On Conan Doyle; or, The Whole Art of Storytelling (Princeton: Princeton University Press, 2011) 
 Browsings: A Year of Reading, Collecting, and Living with Books (New York: Pegasus, 2015) On Conan Doyle was awarded the 2012 Edgar Award in the Best Critical/Biographical category. (Reviewer Darrell Schweitzer lauds the book in The New York Review of Science Fiction.)

Family
Dirda lives in Silver Spring, Maryland, with his wife, Marian Peck Dirda, a prints and drawings conservator at the National Gallery of Art. They have three sons: Christopher (b. 1984), Michael (b. 1987), and Nathaniel (b. 1990).

See also
Ron Charles
Jonathan Yardley

References

External links

Michael Dirda "Browsings" blog at American ScholarMichael Dirda columns at The Washington Post 
 Michael Dirda essays and reviews at BarnesandNobleReview.com
 Michael Dirda archive at The New York Review of Books 
"Book Shopping with the Best-Read Man in America", The Paris Review'', November 7, 2012

1948 births
Living people
Cornell University alumni
Oberlin College alumni
American literary critics
Edgar Award winners
Pulitzer Prize for Criticism winners
The Washington Post people